Anders Lindbäck (born 3 May 1988) is a Swedish professional ice hockey goaltender who is currently playing with Brynäs IF of the Swedish Hockey League (SHL). He has previously played for the Nashville Predators, Tampa Bay Lightning, Dallas Stars, Buffalo Sabres and Arizona Coyotes in the National Hockey League (NHL).

Playing career

Junior
Lindbäck began his career with the Junior 18 Brynäs IF team in 2003 and played his first elite game in 2006. He was loaned out to the Uppsala-based team Almtuna IS of HockeyAllsvenskan for the duration of the 2007–08 season.

Professional
Lindbäck was drafted in the seventh round of the 2008 NHL Entry Draft, 207th overall, by the Nashville Predators.

On 25 March 2009 Lindbäck signed a contract with Timrå IK with the intent to play for the team during the 2009–10 season.

For the 2010–11 season, Lindbäck made the move to North America, and made his NHL debut on 9 October in relief of Pekka Rinne for the Nashville Predators against the Anaheim Ducks at Bridgestone Arena in Nashville. He recorded his first NHL shutout on 11 December against the Florida Panthers, then, just two days later on 13 December, Lindbäck recorded his second career shutout against the New York Islanders in back-to-back games.

During the 2012–13 NHL lockout, Lindbäck played for Ilves in the Finnish Liiga. He posted a .930 save percentage and 2.33 goals against average in 12 games.

On 15 June 2012, Lindbäck was traded to the Tampa Bay Lightning, along with Kyle Wilson and a seventh-round draft pick, for Sébastien Caron, two second-round draft picks in the 2012 NHL Entry Draft and a third-round draft pick in the 2013 NHL Entry Draft.

After two disappointing seasons with the Lightning organization, Lindbäck was not tendered a new contract and was released as a free agent. On 1 July 2014, he was signed to a one-year contract with the Dallas Stars.

Lindbäck played only 10 games in Dallas before being traded, along with a conditional third-round pick, to the Buffalo Sabres in exchange for fellow Swedish goaltender Jhonas Enroth. Lindbäck made his debut for the Sabres in a start on 3 March 2015, against his former team, the Tampa Bay Lightning.

With the Sabres looking in a different direction for their goaltending options, Lindbäck signed a one-year contract as a free agent with the Arizona Coyotes on 1 July 2015. After a third successive subpar season in the NHL with the Coyotes, Lindback remained a free agent over the following summer.

On 16 September 2016, it was announced that Lindbäck was invited to Professional Tryout contract with the New Jersey Devils. Following his participation in the Devils training camp, Lindback was released from his try-out. On 25 October 2016, Lindbäck agreed to a try-out with the Ontario Reign of the AHL, in sight of the backup role with affiliate, the Los Angeles Kings. He appeared in 4 games with the Reign, failing to impress before he was released on 19 November 2016.

Having returned to his native Sweden, Lindbäck agreed to a play in the top-flight SHL for the first time since 2010, signing a deal for the remainder of the 2016–17 season with Rögle BK on 14 December 2016. Assuming the starting role, he collected 7 wins in 23 games with Rögle BK missing the playoffs to enter a relegation battle. He won each of his four games in the post-season to maintain Rögle's status in the SHL.

On 1 July 2017, Lindbäck returned to his original club in the NHL, agreeing to a one-year, two-way contract with the Nashville Predators.

On 15 September 2018, Lindbäck signed a one-year contract with Davos of the Swiss National League (NL). In the 2018–19 season, he was unable to attain success with Davos, collecting just 12 wins in 31 games as Davos entered a relegation playoff.

At the conclusion of his contract, Lindbäck continued his journeyman career, accepting a one-year contract as a free agent with Russian club, Torpedo Nizhny Novgorod of the KHL, on 7 May 2019. In his debut KHL season in 2019–20, Lindbäck enjoyed a successful season with Torpedo, collecting 17 wins and posting a 2.39 goals against average.

On 5 May 2020, Lindbäck left Torpedo as a free agent and was signed to a one-year contract with Finnish KHL club, Jokerit. He made 28 appearances during his second season with Jokerit before the club withdrew from the KHL during the 2021–22 season due to the Russian invasion of Ukraine.

As a free agent, Lindbäck returned to his roots in agreeing to a three-year contract with his original SHL club, Brynäs IF, on 20 May 2022.

International play

Anders currently holds the record for shortest time played by any participant in the Ice Hockey World Championships. He played one second in Sweden's win against Germany in the 2010 bronze medal game.

Personal life
Lindbäck was diagnosed with Adult-onset Still's disease months before he entered the 2008 NHL Draft, which made him get drafted so late despite his excellence. He is close friends with former teammate and fellow Swede Patric Hörnqvist.

Growing up in Gävle, Lindbäck has been a friend of Jacob Markström since childhood, and they both played for Brynäs IF during the 2008–09 season. As a result of Lindbäck's trade to Tampa Bay, they were playing for division rivals (Tampa Bay Lightning and Florida Panthers) between 2012 and 2014 until Markström's trade to the Vancouver Canucks.

Career statistics

Regular season and playoffs

References

External links
 

1988 births
Living people
Almtuna IS players
Arizona Coyotes players
Brynäs IF players
Buffalo Sabres players
Dallas Stars players
HC Davos players
Jokerit players
Milwaukee Admirals players
Nashville Predators draft picks
Nashville Predators players
Ontario Reign (AHL) players
People from Gävle
Rögle BK players
Swedish ice hockey goaltenders
Syracuse Crunch players
Tampa Bay Lightning players
Texas Stars players
Timrå IK players
Torpedo Nizhny Novgorod players
Sportspeople from Gävleborg County